Count Carl Gustaf Löwenhielm (January 30, 1790 – May 18, 1858) was a Swedish diplomat and Lieutenant general.

Carl Gustaf Löwenhielm was born in Värmland and grew up in a manor house. He joined the military in 1809 and in 1811 became courtier in the service of the Crown Prince, the future King Oscar I of Sweden. In 1812 he traveled to Russia to join the anti-Napoleonic cause. He fought in the Russian army against the French in the battles of Borodino and Leipzig and was present during the conquest of Paris in 1814. He married on 18 September 1817 Jacquette Löwenhielm, the mistress of King Oscar I of Sweden and Norway. The couple had no children and divorced in 1828.

In 1821, he was promoted to the rank of colonel and served in the general staff of Sweden. He traveled to Bavaria in 1822 on a mission from Prince Oscar to ask for the hand of Josephine of Leuchtenberg on his behalf. In 1824 he was appointed to the equivalent of Swedish ambassador to the Ottoman Empire and served in Istanbul until 1830. Löwenhielm detested his assignment to Turkey and considered the time there a waste of years. He nonetheless managed to accomplish a deal with the Ottoman government through which Swedish merchant ships were allowed to pass through the Bosphorus. After his years in Turkey, Löwenhielm also worked for some years as a Swedish envoy to the Imperial Court in Vienna.

In 1840 Löwenhielm married in Vienna Countess Natalie Alexandra von Buxhoeveden (1814-1867), a granddaughter of Friedrich Wilhelm von Buxhoeveden. This time the marriage was a happy one, and as Löwenhielm had inherited a large sum of money from his father he retired from diplomatic duties and settles in Värmland on the family estate. He served as County Governor of Gothenburg and Bohus County between 1843 and 1845 and later again served as a military officer. During the First Schleswig War, he commanded the contingent of volunteers from Sweden and Norway fighting for Denmark in the war with success.

References

External links

1790 births
1858 deaths
19th-century Swedish painters
Swedish male painters
Swedish diplomats
Swedish nobility
Governors of Gothenburg and Bohus County
People from Grums Municipality
Swedish generals
19th-century Swedish male artists